A smoking companion set or smoke set, is an object both decorative and useful. It has compartments for cigars, cigarettes, matches, ashtrays and burned matches.

They were popular in Europe circa 1900.

External links
 http://tobaccoantiques.com/cgi-bin/imcart/display.cgi?cat=3

Smoking